Ravet is a neighbourhood in the city of Pune, Maharashtra, India. It is located within Pimpri Chinchwad. The Pavana river helps form the southern border of the neighbourhood.

Geography 
Ravet is located at the intersection of Mumbai-Pune Expressway & Katraj-Dehu Bypass.

The Basket Bridge on Pavana River is located at Ravet.

Nearby suburbs to Ravet are Pradhikaran, Walhekarwadi, Bijalinagar-Chinchwad, Punawale, Kiwale, Wakad & Dehu Road.
PCMC is developing new gardens & internal roads too.

The Pavana river flows through Ravet.

Demographics 
The suburb mainly attracts floating student population & young IT professionals.

Education

Education 
The suburb has educational institutes such as Pimpri Chinchwad College of Engineering and Research (PCCOE&R), D.Y. Patil Dnyanshanti School, S.B.Patil School, S.B. Patil Junior College & Symbiosis Skills Open University. On the border with Akurdi is D Y Patil International University

City International School & D.Y.Patil Dnyanshanti School are opening soon.

Hospitals 
Bhole Children's Clinic 
is located in Ravet for to serve the children in area of Punawale, Ravet, Kiwale, Akurdi, Tathwade and Chinchwad.

Economy 
Akashraj One Mall is located in Ravet.

Transport 
Rainbow BRTS operates on Aundh-Ravet BRT Road since 2016.
Nigdi to Mukai Chowk BRT will be operational from next year.
Nearest railway station is Akurdi Railway Station.

References

Villages in Pune district